= Notre Dame Fighting Irish basketball =

Notre Dame Fighting Irish basketball may refer to:

- Notre Dame Fighting Irish men's basketball
- Notre Dame Fighting Irish women's basketball
